Lidoro Julian Oliver (born 18 September 1915, date of death unknown) is an Argentine boxer who competed in the 1936 Summer Olympics.

In 1936 he was eliminated in the quarter-finals of the lightweight class after losing his fight to Poul Kops.

External links
profile
  

1915 births
Year of death missing
Lightweight boxers
Olympic boxers of Argentina
Boxers at the 1936 Summer Olympics
Argentine male boxers